Jacques de Longuyon of Lorraine is the author of a chanson de geste,   Les Voeux du paon ("The Vows of the Peacock"),  written for Thibaut de Bar, bishop of Liège in 1312. It was one of the most popular romances of the 14th century, and introduces the concept of the Nine Worthies.

Literature
Edward Billings Ham, Three Neglected Manuscripts of the Voeux du Paon, Modern Language Notes (1931).

See also
Vœux du faisan
Longuyon

External links
 Images from manuscript of Les Voeux du Paon, New York Public Library
 

14th-century French writers
Year of birth missing
Year of death missing
People from Lorraine
French male writers